BCFC may refer to one of the following association football clubs:

 Ballyclare Comrades F.C., Northern Ireland
 Bath City F.C., England
 Bentley Colliery F.C., near Doncaster, England
 Birmingham City F.C., England 
 Bishop's Cleeve F.C., near Cheltenham, England
 Bloemfontein Celtic F.C., South Africa
 Brechin City F.C., Scotland
 Bristol City F.C., England 
 Bangor City F.C., Wales

See also
Bradford City A.F.C.